Chaudoir's Dock is a dock  in the unincorporated community of Namur, part of Union township in Door County, Wisconsin in the United States.

Chaudoir's Dock was an important shipping and working dock within the town. The state authorized the Chaudoir brothers to build and maintain a dock and pier into the bay in 1874. In 1944 the dock was sold to the county in the interest in keeping the dock open to the public.

References

Docks (maritime)
Redeveloped ports and waterfronts in the United States
Buildings and structures in Door County, Wisconsin